Koike is a Japanese surname.  Notable people with the surname include:

 Akihiko Koike, a retired Japanese male race walker
 Akiko Koike, a Japanese voice actress
 Akira Koike, a Japanese politician
, Japanese actor
 Ayame Koike, a Japanese actress
 Eiko Koike, a Japanese idol and actress
 Junki Koike, a Japanese football player
 Kazuko Koike, a Japanese creative director
 Kazumori Koike, a Japanese sprint canoer
 Kazuo Koike, a Japanese manga writer, novelist, and entrepreneur
 Kensuke Koike, a Japanese contemporary visual artist
, Japanese writer
 Masaaki Koike, a Japanese baseball player
 Masakatsu Koike, a Japanese politician
 Reizo Koike, a Japanese breaststroke swimmer
 Rina Koike, a Japanese idol and actress
 Ryohei Koike, a Japanese football player
, Japanese speed skater
, Japanese ice hockey player
 Shota Koike, a Japanese baseball catcher
 Takeshi Koike, a Japanese studio animator, illustrator, and film director
 Teppei Koike, a Japanese actor and singer
 Toshiki Koike, a Japanese football player
 Yui Koike, a Japanese gravure idol and actress
 Yuki Koike (footballer), a Japanese football player
 Yuki Koike (athlete), a Japanese sprinter
 Yuriko Koike, a Japanese politician

Fictional Characters
, a ramen chief character from Little Ghost Q-Taro and Doraemon

Japanese-language surnames